Hichem Essifi (born 27 February 1987) is a professional Tunisian footballer who plays as a forward for Al-Diriyah. He has earned eight caps for his country, scoring three goals.

International career
Essifi has been capped by Tunisia and scored 2 goals against Seychelles.

International goals
Scores and results list Tunisia's goal tally first.

References

Tunisian footballers
Living people
1987 births
ES Zarzis players
Club Africain players
Olympique Béja players
CS Hilalien players
US Monastir (football) players
Stade Gabèsien players
JS Kairouan players
CA Bordj Bou Arréridj players
Ohod Club players
Al-Ain FC (Saudi Arabia) players
Al-Faisaly SC players
Al-Wehdat SC players
Al-Diriyah Club players
Expatriate footballers in Algeria
Tunisian expatriate sportspeople in Algeria
Expatriate footballers in Saudi Arabia
Tunisian expatriate sportspeople in Saudi Arabia
Expatriate footballers in Jordan
Tunisian expatriate sportspeople in Jordan
Saudi Professional League players
Saudi First Division League players
Association football forwards
Tunisia international footballers
Jordanian Pro League players
2016 African Nations Championship players
Tunisia A' international footballers